This is a list of political offices which have been held by a woman, with details of the first woman holder of each office. It is ordered by the countries in Asia and by dates of appointment. Please observe that this list is meant to contain only the first woman to hold of a political office, and not all the female holders of that office.

Afghanistan

 Member of Parliament  –  Kubra Noorzai, Aziza Amani, Naiba from Khulm and Najiba from Herat – 1964
 Senator  – Roqia Abubakr, Khadija Ahrari, Masuma Esmati-Wardak, Anahita Ratebzad, Aziza Gardizi and Homeira Seljuqi  – 1965 
 Minister (Health minister)  –  Kubra Noorzai  – 1965
 Director of the Foreign and Publication Department  –  Maliha Zafar  –  1967
 Minister without Portfolio  –  Shafriqua Siayel  – 1971
 Advisor for the Ministry of Planning  –  Shafriqua Siayel  – 1972
 Minister of state for Women's Affairs  –  Shafriqua Siayel  – 1976

Democratic Republic of Afghanistan
 Ambassador (to Yugoslavia) – Anahita Ratebzad – 1978
 Minister of Social Affairs – Anahita Ratebzad – 1978
 Minister of Education – Anahita Ratebzad – 1979
 Deputy Chairman of the Presidium of the Revolutionary Council (Vice President) – Anahita Ratebzad – 1980

Islamic Republic of Afghanistan
 Deputy Premier Minister  –  Sima Samar  – 2001
 Minister of Youth Affairs – Amina Afzali – 2004
Governor – Habiba Sorabi – 2005
Mayor – Azra Jafari, (Nili) – 2008
Afghanistan's Permanent Representative to the United Nations – Adela Raz  – 2018
Chairwoman of Election Commission – Hawa Alam Nooristani  – 2019
Chairwoman of IECC – Zuhra Bayan Shinwari –

Azerbaijan

Soviet Socialist Republic 
 Cabinet Minister – Ayna Sultanova – 1938
 Minister of Justice – Ayna Sultanova – 1938
 Chairperson of the Committee for Science and Technology at the Council of Ministers  – Tahira Tahirova – 1957
 Minister of Education – Sakina Aliyeva – 1958
 Minister of Foreign Affairs – Tahira Tahirova – 1959
 Deputy Premier Minister – Tahira Tahirova – 1963
 Vice-president  –  S.M. Mamedaliyeva  – 1963 
 Minister of Higher and Special Education  - Zuleikha Ismail-Kyzy Guseinova - 1965
 Minister Social Affairs - L.P. Lykova - 1965 
 Head of the Central Committee Department of Agriculture - L.D. Radzhabova - 1971
 Minister of Public Service/Consumers Protection - Zuleikha Mageran Kyzy Gasanova - 1974
 Minister of Trade - Svetlana Chingvitz-Kyzy Kasimova - 1979
 Minister of Foreign Affairs – Elmira Gafarova – 1983
 Chairwoman of the Presidium of the Supreme Soviet – Elmira Gafarova – 1989
 Speaker of the National Assembly of Azerbaijan – Elmira Gafarova – 1990

Republic
 Chairwoman of the National Assembly – Elmira Gafarova – 1991
 Secretary of State – Lala Shevket – 1993
Minister of Justice - Südaba Hasanova -1995
 Vice President of Azerbaijan - Mehriban Aliyeva -  2017

Bahrain

Member of the Council of Representatives – Lateefa Al Gaood – 2006 (first female MP in the Gulf region)

Bangladesh
 Minister of State for Health and Social Welfare – Nurjahan Murshed – 1972
 Minister of Social Affairs and Family Planning – Nurjahan Murshed – 1973
 Minister of Education – Badrunnessa Ahmed – 1973
 Minister of Land Administration and Land Reforms – Benita Roy – 1975
 Minister of Women's Affairs – Aminah Rahman – 1978
 Prime Minister – Khaleda Zia – 1991
 Minister of Agriculture – Matia Chowdhury – 2009
 Minister of Home Affairs – Sahara Khatun – 2009
 Minister of Foreign Affairs – Dipu Moni – 2009
 Speaker of the Parliament  – Shirin Sharmin Chaudhury – 2013
 Minister of State for Public Administration – Ismat Ara Sadek – 2014
 Minister of State of Women and Children Affairs – Meher Afroz Chumki – 2014

Bhutan 
 Regent – Ashi Kesang – 1972
 King's Representative  in the Ministry of Finance  – Ashi Sonam Chhoden Wangchuck – 1974
 Special Advisor in the Ministry of Finance – Ashi Sonam Chhoden Wangchuck – 1996
 Chair of Council of Ministers – Ashi Sonam Chhoden Wangchuck – 1998
 Minister of Works and Human Settlement – Aum Dorji Choden – 2013

Cambodia
 Member of Parliament – Tong Siv Eng – 1958
 Secretary of State for Labour – Tong Siv Eng – 1959
 Minister of Social Action – Tong Siv Eng – 1961
 Minister of Health – Tong Siv Eng – 1963
 Secretary of State for National Education – Diep Dinar – 1966
 Secretary of State for Information – Chine Renne – 1969
 Secretary of State for Tourism – Ung Mung – 1969
 Cambodian Deputy Permanent Representative to the United Nations – ‘Mrs Nhoung Peng’ – 1970
 Under-Secretary of State for Finances – Pheng Santhan – 1972
 Under-Secretary of State for Labour and Social Welfare – Plech Phirun – 1972
 Minister of Education – Ieng Thirith – 1975
 Minister of Culture and Education  – Yun Yat – 1976

China

Early Imperial China
 Regent (Empress Regent of China) – Lü Zhi – 202 BC

Mid-Imperial China
 Monarch (Empress Regnant of China) - Wu Zetian – 690 AD

Republic of China (1912–1949)

 Minister for Women's Affairs – He Xiangning – 1923 
 Member of Government Council – Song Qingling – 1927
 Member of the Central Government Council – He Xianging – 1928
 Acting Head of the Guangzhou government – Chen Bijun – 1944
 Member of the National Council of the Nationalist Government – Wu Yifang – 1947

People's Republic of China 

 Minister of Textile Industry – Feng Yunhe – 1949
 Minister of Health – Li Dequan – 1949
 Justice Minister – Shi Liang – 1949–1959 
Vice Chairperson of the Central People's Government – Soong Chingling – 1949
 Vice Chairperson of the Chinese People's Political Consultative Conference – Soong Chingling – 1954
 Minister of People's Supervision – Qian Ying – 1954  
 Minister of Interior – Qian Ying – 1959  
 Vice Chairperson (Vice President) – Soong Chingling – 1959
 Vice Chairperson of the Standing Committee of the National People's Congress – Soong Ching-ling – 1959
 Chairperson (Co-acting President) – Soong Ching-ling – 1968
 Member of the Politburo – Jiang Qing – 1969 
 Vice Premier – Wu Guixian – 1975
 Honorary President (Head of State) – Soong Ching-ling – 1981
 State Councillor – Chen Muhua – 1982
 Governor (of Jiangsu) – Gu Xiulian – 1983.

Republic of China 
 Minister and Commissioner for Oversea Chinese – He Xiangning – 1949
 Deputy Chairperson of Economic Planning Council - Shirley Kuo Wang-jung - 1973
 Minister of Finance  - Shirley Kuo Wang-jung - 1988
 Minister of State and Chairperson of Council of Economic Development  - Shirley Kuo Wang-jung - 1990
 Minister of Transport and Communication - Yeh Chu-lan - 2000
Vice President of the Republic of China – Annette Lu – 2000–2008
President of the Republic of China – Tsai Ing-wen – 2016

East Timor

 Minister of Justice – Ana Maria Pessoa Pereira da Silva Pinto – 2001
 Minister of Finance – Emilia Maria Valéria Pires – 2007
 Foreign minister (acting) – Adalgisa Magno Guterres – 2007

Hong Kong 

 British Hong Kong

 Deputy Secretary for Government – Anson Chan – 1975
 Director of Social Services – Anson Chan – 1980
 Commissioner for Culture – Elizabeth Chi-lieh Wong-Chien – 1982
 Secretary of Economy – Anson Chan – 1987
 Chief Secretary – Anson Chan – 1993

 Hong Kong Special Administrative Region
 President of the Legislative Council – Rita Fan – 1997
Secretary for Justice – Elsie Leung – 1997 
 Chief Secretary – Anson Chan – 1997
 Chief Executive – Carrie Lam – 2017

India

Central Government

British Raj
 Leader of a Major Party – Annie Besant – 1917
 Member of Provincial Legislative Assembly – Dr. Muthulaksmi Reddy – 1921
 Member of Central Legislature – Radhabai Subbarayan – 1937
 Provincial Minister – Vijaya Lakshmi Pandit – 1938
 Member of National Defence Council – Begum Jahanara Shahnawaz – 1942

Dominion and Republic of India
 Minister of Health – Rajkumari Amrit Kaur – 1947
 Minister of Communication – Rajkumari Amrit Kaur – 1951
 Minister of State For Home Affairs – Maragatham Chandrasekar – 1962
Minister of Information and Broadcasting  – Indira Gandhi – 1964
 Minister of State of External Affairs – Lakshmi N. Menon – 1966
 Prime Minister – Indira Gandhi – 1966
Minister of External Affairs  – Indira Gandhi – 1967
Leader of the Lok Sabha   (Upper House of the Parliament) – Indira Gandhi – 1967
 Minister of Finance   –  Indira Gandhi – 1970
 Minister of Home Affairs  – Indira Gandhi – 1970
 Minister of Defence  – Indira Gandhi – 1975
Chief Election Commissioner of India – V. S. Ramadevi – 1990
Minister of Railways  – Mamata Banerjee – 1999
 Leader of the Opposition in Lok Sabha (Lower House of the Parliament)  –  Sonia Gandhi – 1999
Ministry of Women and Child Development  – Mamata Banerjee – 2006
 President – Pratibha Patil – 2007
 Speaker of the Lok Sabha (Lower House of the Parliament) – Meira Kumar – 2009
Ministry of Minority Affairs – Najma Heptullah – 2014
Minister of Foreign Affairs - Sushma Swaraj - 2014
Tribal President and First President to be born after independence - Droupadi Murmu

Andhra Pradesh

Governor – Sharada Mukherjee – 1977
 Home Minister of Andhra Pradesh – Sabita Indra Reddy – 2009

Assam

Chief Minister – Anwara Taimur – 1980

Bihar

Chief Minister – Rabri Devi – 1997

Delhi

Mayor of Delhi – Aruna Asaf Ali – 1958
Chief Minister – Sushma Swaraj – 1998
Chief Minister – Sheila Dikshit – 1998

Goa
Chief Minister of Goa – Shashikala Kakodkar (1973–79)

Gujarat

Governor – Sharada Mukherjee – 1978
Chief minister - Aanandi Ben Patel - 2014

Himachal Pradesh

Governors – Sheila Kaul – 1995

Karnataka

Governor – V.S. Ramadevi – 1999

Kerala

Governor – Jothi Venkatachalam – 1977

Madhya Pradesh

Chief Minister – Uma Bharati – 2003

Maharashtra

Governor  – Vijayalakshmi Pandit – 1963

Orissa

Chief Minister – Nandini Satpathy – 1972

Punjab

Chief Minister – Rajinder Kaur Bhattal - 1996

Rajasthan

Chief Minister – Vasundhara Raje – 2003
Governor – Pratibha Patil – 2004

Tamil Nadu

Chief Minister – V. N. Janaki Ramachandran – 1989
Governor – Fatima Beevi – 1997

Uttarakhand

Governor – Margaret Alva – 2009

Uttar Pradesh

 Governor – Sarojini Naidu – 1947 
 Chief Minister – Sucheta Kriplani – 1963

West Bengal

 Governor – Padmaja Naidu – 1956
 Chief Minister – Mamata Banerjee – 2011

Indonesia

Ancient Indonesia
 Queen regnant of Kalingga – Shima – c. 674
 Queen regnant of Medang – Isyana – c. 947
 Queen regnant of Bali – Mahendradatta – c. 980
 Queen regnant of Majapahit – Tribhuwana Wijaya – 1328
 Queen regnant of Bone - We Banrigau Makkaleppie Daeng Marowa - 1496
 Queen regnant of Kalinyamat – Ratu Kalinyamat – 1549
 Sultanah of Aceh – Taj ul-Alam – 1641

Dutch East Indies
Member of Volksraad - Cornelia Razoux Schultz-Metzer - 1935

East Indonesia
 Mayor of Makassar – Salawati Daud – 1949

Republic of Indonesia

 Minister of Social Service – Maria Ulfah Santoso – 1946
 Minister of Manpower – Soerastri Karma Trimurti – 1947
 Minister of Basic Education and Culture – Artati Marzuki-Sudirdjo – 1964
 Deputy Speaker of the People's Representative Council/People's Consultative Assembly – Fatimah Achmad – 1997
 Minister of Agriculture – Justika Sjarifuddin Baharsjah – 1998
 Vice President – Megawati Sukarnoputri – 1999
 President – Megawati Sukarnoputri – 2001
 Minister of Trade – Rini Soemarno – 2001
 Minister of Health – Siti Fadilah Supari – 2004
 Governor – Ratu Atut Chosiyah – 2005
 Finance Minister – Sri Mulyani Indrawati – 2005
 Mayor – Tri Rismaharini – 2010 (First female mayor of Surabaya who was elected directly after the 1998 reformation)
 Minister of Tourism – Mari Elka Pangestu – 2011  (The ministry fell under the name 'Ministry of Tourism and Creative Economy')
 Coordinating Minister for Human Development and Cultural Affairs – Puan Maharani – 2014 (First Indonesian female to ever hold 'Coordinating Minister' post.)
 Foreign Minister – Retno Marsudi – 2014
 Minister of Environment and Forestry – Siti Nurbaya Bakar – 2014
 Minister of Maritime Affairs and Fisheries – Susi Pudjiastuti – 2014
 Speaker of the People's Representative Council – Puan Maharani – 2019

Iran

Sasanian Empire
 Monarch of Persia – Purandokht – 630

Imperial State
Member of the Parliament – Mehrangiz Dowlatshahi, Nayereh Ebtehaj-Samii, Showkat Malek Jahanbani, Nezhat Nafisi, Farrokhroo Parsa and Hajar Tarbiat – 1963
Senator – Mehrangiz Manouchehrian and Shams ol-Moluk Mosahab – 1963
 Deputy Minister of Education – Farrokhroo Parsa – 1965
Minister of Education – Farrokhroo Parsa – 1968
 Mayor (Ahvaz) – Dabir Azam Hosna – 1970
 Minister for Women's Affairs – Mahnaz Afkhami – 1976

Islamic Republic
 Advisor to President – Shahla Habibi – 1995
 Vice President – Massoumeh Ebtekar – 1997
 Head of Environmental Protection Organization – Massoumeh Ebtekar – 1997
 Member of Board of the Parliament – Soheila Jolodarzadeh – 2000
 Minister of Health – Marzieh Vahid Dastjerdi – 2009
 Vice President in Legal Affairs – Elham Aminzadeh – 2013
 Spokesperson for the Ministry of Foreign Affairs – Marzieh Afkham – 2013
 Ambassador – Marzieh Afkham – 2015

Iraq
 Minister of Municipalities – Naziha al-Dulaimi – 1959 (also first female government minister in the Arab world)
 Minister of Higher Education – Suad Khalil Ismail – 1969
 Minister of Public Works and Municipalities – Nisrin Barwari – 2003
 Minister of Labour – Leila Abdul-Latif – 2004

Israel

 Minister of Labor – Golda Meir – 1949
 Minister of Foreign Affairs – Golda Meir – 1955
 Cabinet Secretary – Yael Uzai – 1963
 Prime Minister – Golda Meir – 1969
 Minister of Health – Shoshana Arbeli-Almozlino – 1986
 State Comptroller – Miriam Ben Porat – 1988
 State Attorney – Dorit Beinisch – 1989
 Minister of Education – Shulamit Aloni – 1992
 Minister of Environment – Ora Namir – 1992
 Minister of Communications – Shulamit Aloni – 1993
 Minister of Science and Culture – Shulamit Aloni – 1993
 Minister of Immigrant Absorption – Yuli Tamir – 1999
 Minister of Regional Cooperation – Tzipi Livni – 2001
 Minister of Commerce and Industry – Dalia Itzik – 2001
 Minister of Agriculture and Rural Development – Tzipi Livni – 2003 
 Minister of Housing and Construction – Tzipi Livni – 2003 
 Minister of Justice – Tzipi Livni – 2004
 Speaker of the Knesset – Dalia Itzik – 2006
 President (acting) – Dalia Itzik – 2007
National Parliament – Pnina Tamano-Shata – 2013

Japan

 Queen of Yamatai – Himiko – 188 AD*
 Regent – Jingū of Japan – 209 AD*
 Empress regnant – Empress Suiko – 592 AD
 Member of Parliament – Shidzue Katō – 1946
 Minister of Health and Welfare – Masa Nakayama – 1960
 Vice Chair of Political Party (Japan Socialist Party, 社会党) – Takako Doi – 1966
 Minister of the Environment – Shige Ishimoto – 1984
 Chair of Political Party (Japan Socialist Party, 社会党) – Takako Doi – 1986
 Mayor (Ashiya city) – Harue Kitamura – 1991
 Speaker of House of Representatives – Takako Doi – 1993
Minister of Justice –  Ritsuko Nagao – 1996
Governor of Osaka Prefecture – Fusae Ota – 2000
Foreign minister – Makiko Tanaka – 2001
 Governor of Kumamoto Prefecture – Yoshiko Shiotani – 2001
 Governor of Chiba Prefecture – Akiko Domoto – 2001
 Governor of Hokkaidō Prefecture – Harumi Takahashi – 2003
 President of House of Councillors – Chikage Ogi – 2004
 Governor of Shiga Prefecture – Yukiko Kada – 2006
Minister of Defense – Yuriko Koike – 2007
Minister of Justice – Keiko Chiba – 2009  (First justice minister to witness an execution)
 Governor of Yamagata Prefecture – Mieko Yoshimura – 2009
 Mayor (Ōtsu city) – Naomi Koshi – 2012
 Governor of Tokyo Prefecture – Yuriko Koike – 2016

Jordan
 Minister of Social Development – Ina'am Al-Mufti – 1980
 Minister of Culture and Information – Leila A. Sharaf  – 1984
 Member of Parliament – Leila A. Sharaf – 1989
 Minister of Trade and Industry – Rima Khalaf – 1993
 Minister of Planning – Rima Khalaf – 1995
 Deputy Premier Minister – Rima Khalaf – 1999

Kazakhstan

Kazakh Soviet Socialist Republic
 Vice-chairperson of the Executive Committee – Maryam Tugambayeva – 1932
 Acting Chairperson of the Executive Committee – Kalima Amankulova – 1938
 Deputy Premier Minister – Zaure S. Omarova – 1959 
 Acting Chairperson of the Presidium of the Supreme Soviet – Kapitalina Nikolaevna Kryukova – 1960
 Minister of Culture – Laila Galievna Galimzhanova – 1965
 Minister of Social Affairs – Zaure S. Omarova – 1966
 Deputy Premier Minister  –  Dametken Z. Sarsenova  – 1975 
 Foreign minister – Akmaral Arystanbekova – 1989

Kyrgyzstan

 Ruler of Alay Kyrgyz - Kurmanjan Datka - 1862

Kirghiz Soviet Socialist Republic
Chairman of the Supreme Soviet – Maryam Tugambayeva – 1937
 Acting Chairperson of the Central Executive Committee – Kalima Amankulova – 1938
 Deputy Minister of Finance – Sakin Bergmantrovna – 1952
 Minister of Culture - Kuluypa Konduchalova -1958
 Vice-president - B. Musuralieva - 1959
 Deputy Premier Minister  – Sakin Bergmantrovna – 1961
 Minister of Foreign Affairs – Sakin Bergmantrovna – 1966
 Supreme Court Member - Kadicha Apaitova - 1980

Kyrgyz Republic
Foreign minister – Roza Otunbayeva – 1992
President – Roza Otunbayeva – 2010
Supreme Court Member - Kadicha Apaitova - 1991
Minister of Education - Chinara Jakypova - 1992
Chairperson of Constitutional Court - Cholpon Baekova - 1993 
Chairperson of Social Fund, Minister - Roza Aknazarova - 1999
Minister of Education - Ishengul Boljurova - 2002
Minister of labour and Social Protection - Roza Aknazarova - 2004
Chairperson of Supreme Court - Janyl Alieva - 2008
Minister of Social Protection - Aigul Ryskulova - 2009
Minister of Labour and Employment - Aigul Ryskulova - 2010
Minister of Education and Science - Elvira Sarieva - 2014
Minister of Education and Science - Gulmira Kudaibergenova - 2015
Deputy Prime Minister - Cholpon Sultanbekova - 2016
Minister of Finance - Baktygul Jeenbaeva -2018
Deputy Speaker of Parliament - Aida Kasymalieva - 2018
Deputy Prime Minister Altynai Omurbekova - 2019

Kuwait

 Undersecretary of Higher Education – Rasha as-Sabakh – 1991
 Minister – Massouma al-Mubarak – 2005.
 Member of the National Assembly – Aseel al-Awadhi, Rola Dashti, Massouma al-Mubarak and Salwa al-Jassar – 2009

Laos
 Cabinet Member and Governor of the Central Bank – Pany Yathotou – 1987
 Minister to the Prime Minister's Office for International Cooperation – Pany Yathotou – 1997

Lebanon
 Member of Parliament  – Myrna Bustani – 1963 
 Minister of Industry – Leila Al Solh – 2004
 Minister of Finance – Raya Haffar al-Hassan – 2009
 Minister of Energy and Water - Nada Boustani Khoury
 Minister of Defence - Zeina Akar - 2020

Macau

Portuguese Macau
 Undersecretary of Administration – Adelina Carvalho – 1985
 President of the Legislative Assembly – Susana Chou – 1999

Special Administration of PRC China
 Secretary for Administration and Justice – Silva Chan - 1999

Malaysia

 Councillor of the Federal Legislative Council (elected) – Che Halimahton Abdul Majid – 1955
 Member of Parliament – Fatimah Hashim, Khadijah Sidek, Zainon Munshi Sulaiman – 1959
 Senator – Aishah Ghani – 1962
 Minister of Social Welfare  – Fatimah Hashim – 1969 (First female Minister in Cabinet of Malaysia) 
 Minister of General Welfare – Aishah Ghani – 1973
 Minister of Public Enterprises – Rafidah Aziz – 1980
 Minister of Commerce and Industry – Rafidah Aziz – 1987
 Minister of International Trade and Industry – Rafidah Aziz – 1990
 Minister of National Unity and Social Development – Napsiah Omar – 1990
 Minister in the Prime Minister's Department – Siti Zaharah Sulaiman – 1999
 Minister of Women and Family Development – Shahrizat Abdul Jalil – 2001 
 Minister of Women, Family and Community Development – Shahrizat Abdul Jalil – 2001
 Minister of Youth and Sports – Azalina Othman Said – 2004
 Minister of Tourism – Azalina Othman Said – 2008
 Minister of Women, Family and Community Development – Ng Yen Yen – 2008 (First female Chinese Minister in Cabinet of Malaysia) 
 Leader of the Opposition in the Malaysian Parliament – Wan Azizah Wan Ismail – 2008
 Deputy President of the Dewan Negara – Armani Mahiruddin – 2009
 President of the Municipal Council of Penang Island – Patahiyah Ismail – 2010 (First woman municipal council president in Malaysia)
 Mayor of Petaling Jaya – Alinah Ahmad – 2013 (First woman mayor in Malaysia)
 Speaker of Selangor State Legislative Assembly – Hannah Yeoh – 2013 (First female Speaker in state legislature)
 Leader of the Opposition in the Penang State Legislative Assembly – Jahara Hamid – 2013
 Mayor of Penang Island – Patahiyah Ismail – 2015
 Leader of the Opposition in the Johor State Legislative Assembly – Gan Peck Cheng – 2015
 President of the Municipal Council of Seberang Perai – Maimunah Mohd Sharif – 2016
 Speaker of Perak State Legislative Assembly – S. Thangeswary – 2016
 Deputy Prime Minister – Wan Azizah Wan Ismail – 2018
 Minister of Housing and Local Government – Zuraida Kamaruddin – 2018
 Minister of Rural and Regional Development – Rina Harun – 2018
 Minister of Energy, Technology, Science, Climate Change and Environment – Yeo Bee Yin – 2018
 Minister of Primary Industries – Teresa Kok – 2018
 Chairperson of the
Public Accounts Committee – Noraini Ahmad – 2019
 Chief Justice of Malaysia – Tengku Maimun Tuan Mat – 2019
 Chief Commissioner of the Malaysian Anti-Corruption Commission – Latheefa Koya – 2019
 Minister of Higher Education – Noraini Ahmad – 2020
 Deputy Speaker of the Dewan Rakyat – Azalina Othman Said – 2020
 Minister of Education  – Fadhlina Sidek  – 2022
 Minister of Health – Zaliha Mustafa  – 2022

Maldives

 Minister of Health  – Moomina Haleem – 1977
Foreign minister (acting) – Mariyam Shakeela  – 2013

Mongolia

Mongolian People's Republic
 Minister (Minister of Health) - Dolgor Puntsag - 1930
 Head of State (acting) – Sühbaataryn Yanjmaa – 1953
 Minister of Labour - Myatauyn Lhaunsuren - 1970
 Minister of Health and Social Affairs - Pagbajabyn Nymadawa - 1990

Mongolia
 Foreign minister – Nyam-Osoryn Tuyaa – 1998
 Prime Minister (acting) – Nyam-Osoryn Tuyaa – 1999

Myanmar

British Burma
 Member of the Legislative Council – Hnin Mya – 1932

Burma
 Member of Parliament – Khin Kyi – 1947
 Minister for and Premier of the Karen State - Daw Ba Maung Chien - 1952
 Minister of Social Welfare – Khin Kyi – 1953

Myanmar
 Social Welfare, Relief and Resettlement minister – Myat Myat Ohn Khin  – 2012
 Education minister – Khin San Yi  – 2014
 Science and Technology minister – Khin San Yi  – 2015
 Foreign minister – Aung San Suu Kyi  – 2016
 State Counsellor – Aung San Suu Kyi  – 2016

Nepal

Kingdom
 Deputy Minister (of Health and Local Self-Governance)  –  Dwarika Devi Thakurani – 1959
 Minister of Health – Shusila Thapa – 1975
 Cabinet Member, State Minister for Labour and Social Welfare – Bhadra Kumari Ghale  – 1982
 Minister of Industry and Trade – Sahana Pradhan – 1990
 Minister of Forests and Soil Conservation – Sahana Pradhan – 1996
 Minister of Women and Welfare – Sahana Pradhan – 1997
 Deputy Prime Minister – Shailaja Acharya – 1998

Republic
Foreign minister – Sahana Pradhan – 2007
President – Bidhya Devi Bhandari – 2015

North Korea

 Central Committee of the Workers' Party of North Korea members – Ho Jong-suk and Pak Chong-ae – 1946
 Minister of Culture – Ho Jong-suk – 1948
 Minister of Justice - Ho Jong-suk - 1957-1959
 Vice-Minister of Light Industry - Kim Pok-sin - 1958
 Minister of Agriculture - Pak Chong-ae - 1961
 Minister of Commerce - Yin Yang-suk - 1962
 Minister of Culture - Pak Yong-sin - 1966
 Minister of Foodstuff and Daily Necessities Industries - Yi Ho-hyok - 1967 
 Minister of Textile and Paper Manufacturing Industry  - Kim Pok-sin - 1971
 Minister of Finance - Yun Gi-jong - 1980
 Vice Premier – Kim Pok-sin – 1982
 Head of the Light Industry Division of the Worker's Party Economic Policy Audit Department - Kim Kyung-hee - 1988
 Minister of Electronics Industry - Han Kwang-bok - 2009
 Chairperson of the Korean Committee for Cultural Relations with Foreign Countries - Kim Jong-suk - 2009
 Deputy Prime Minister - Han Kwang-bok - 2010
 Vice-director of the Workers Party's Propaganda and Agitation Department - Kim Yo-jong - 2014
 Minister of Foreign Affairs - Choe Son-hui - 2022

Oman
 Undersecretary for Social Affairs in the Ministry of Social Affairs, Labour and Vocational Training  –  Thuwaibah bint Ahmad Bin Isa Al-Barwani  – 1997
 Government Minister (Minister of Higher Education) – Rawya Saud Al Busaidi – 2004

Pakistan

Dominion
 Deputy Speaker – Begum Jahanara Shahnawaz – 1947
 Member of Parliament – Begum Shaista Suhrawardy Ikramullah – 1947

Republic
 Minister of Education – Begum Mahmooda Salim Khan – 1962
 Governor (of Sindh) – Begum Ra'ana Liaquat Ali Khan - 1973
 Chair of Major Political Party (Pakistan Peoples Party) – Nusrat Bhutto – 1979
 Minister of State of Science and Technology – Shahzada Saaedur Rashid Abbasi – 1975
 Minister of State of Tourism – Shahzada Saaedur Rashid Abbasi – 1976
 Minister of Population – Dr. Attiya Inayatullah – 1980
 Government Advisor and Chairperson of Tourist Development Corporation – Viqarun Nisa Noon – 1980
 Minister of State of Social Welfare – Begum Afifa Mamdot – 1981
 Prime Minister – Benazir Bhutto – 1988
 Deputy Prime Minister – Nusrat Bhutto – 1980s
 Minister of Information – Syeda Abida Hussain – 1990
  Minister to the Prime Minister, Advisor on Population with Rank of Minister – Syeda Abida Hussain – 1991
 Minister of Finance – Benazir Bhutto – 1993
 Minister of Law and Human Rights – Shahida Jamil – 2002 
 Speaker of the National Assembly of Pakistan – Fahmida Mirza – 2008
 Minister of Foreign Affairs – Hina Rabbani Khar – 2011

West Pakistan
West Pakistan was in existence from 1955 to 1970.
 Minister of Education (1962–65) – Begum Mahmooda Salim Khan

Balochistan
 Minister (1976) – Fazila Aliani
 Minister of Health, Education and Social Welfare (1976) – Fazila Aliani

Punjab
 Parliamentary Secretary (1951) –  Begum Khudeja G.A. Khan

Sindh
 Governor (1973) – Begum Ra'ana Liaquat Ali Khan

Palestine
 Minister of Higher Education and Research – Hanan Ashrawi – 1996
 Minister of Social Affairs – Intissar al-Wazir – 1995
 General Delegate of Palestine to the EU, Belgium and Luxembourg – Leila Shahid – 2006
 Mayor of Ramallah – Janet Mikhail – 2005

Philippines

Commonwealth
 Member of Congress – Elisa Ochoa – 1941

Republic
 Senator – Geronima Pecson – 1947
 Secretary of Social Welfare – Asuncion A. Perez – 1948
 Governor of Metropolitan Manila – Imelda Romualdez Marcos – 1975
 President – Corazon Aquino – 1986
 Secretary of Education – Lourdes Quisumbing – 1986
 Secretary of Agrarian Reform – Miriam Defensor Santiago – 1989
 Senate President pro tempore – Leticia Ramos-Shahani − 1993
 Secretary of Tourism – Gemma Cruz-Araneta – 1998
 Vice President – Gloria Macapagal Arroyo – 1998
 Senate Majority leader – Loren Legarda – 2001
 Secretary of Justice – Merceditas N. Gutierrez – 2002
 Secretary of Foreign Affairs – Delia Albert – 2003
 Secretary of National Defense – Gloria Macapagal Arroyo – 2003 (concurrently as President of the Philippines)
 Chief Justice of the Supreme Court – Maria Lourdes Sereno – 2012
 Speaker of the House of Representatives – Gloria Macapagal Arroyo – 2018

Qatar
 President with rank of Minister of the Supreme Council for Family Affairs – Mozah Bint Nasser Al Misnad – 1998

Saudi Arabia
 Deputy Minister of Education for Women's Affairs – Norah al-Faiz – 2009
 Assistant Speaker of the Consultative Assembly of Saudi Arabia - Hanan Al-Ahmadi - 2020

Singapore
 Minister of State of Community Development – Seet Ai Mee – 1988
 Minister of State of Health and Education – Aline K. Wong – 1990
 Minister in Prime Minister's Office – Lim Hwee Hua – 2009
 Ministry of Culture, Community and Youth – Grace Fu – 2015
 Speaker of the Parliament – Halimah Yacob – 2013
 President – Halimah Yacob – 2017
 Ministry of Manpower – Josephine Teo – 2018
 Ministry of Sustainability and Environment – Grace Fu – 2020
 Ministry of Communications and Information – Josephine Teo – 2021

South Korea

 Minister of Trade and Industry  –  Yim Yong-shin (Louise Yim)  – 1948
 Minister of Information  –  Kim Whal-ran  – 1950
 Minister of Education  –  Kim Ok-Gil  – 1979 
 Minister of Social Affairs and Health  –  Kim Chung-rye  – 1982
 Minister of the Second Ministry of Political Affairs  –  Cho Kyung-hee  – 1988
 Secretary of State for Political Affairs  –  Cho Kyung-hee  – 1989
 Minister of Environment  –  Hwang San-suy  – 1993
 Minister of Culture and Tourism  –  Shin Nak-yun  – 1998
 Minister of Health and Welfare  –  Joo Yang-ja  – 1998
 Presidential Secretary for Public Relations Affairs – Park Sun-sook  – 1999
 Acting Prime Minister – Chang Sang – 2002
Minister of Justice – Kang Kum-sil – 2003–2004 
 Prime Minister – Han Myung-Sook – 2006
 President – Park Geun-hye – 2013
 Deputy Prime Minister – Yoo Eun-hae – 2018

Sri Lanka

British Ceylon
 Member of the State Council – Adeline Molamure – 1931
 Member of Parliament – Florence Senanayake – 1947
 Senator – Adeline Molamure – 1947

Dominion 
 Minister of Health – Vimala Wijewardene – 1956
 Minister of Foreign Affairs – Sirimavo Bandaranaike – 1960
 Minister of Defence – Sirimavo Bandaranaike – 1960
 Prime Minister – Sirimavo Bandaranaike – 1960 (First female Prime Minister in the world)

Republic
 Prime Minister – Chandrika Kumaratunga – 1993 
 President – Chandrika Kumaratunga – 1994
Minister of Justice – Thalatha Athukorale – 2017

Syria

 Member of Parliament – Jihan al-Mosli and Widad Haroun – 1960
 Minister of Culture – Najah al-Attar – 1976
 Minister of Higher Education – Salimah Sanqar – 1992
 Minister of National Guidance – Najah al-Attar – 1994
 Minister of Labour and Social Affairs –  Baria al-Qudsi – 2000
 Vice President – Najah al-Attar – 2006

Tajikistan

Tajik Soviet Socialist Republic
 Vice-president – K. Alueva – 1960
 Deputy Premier Minister – A.N. Atanepesova – 1960
 Deputy Chair of the Presidium of the Supreme Soviet –  Nizoramo Zaripova  – 1966 
 Secretary of the Communist Party Central Committee Department of Propaganda and Agitation – Ibodat Rakhimova – 1966 
 Minister of Trade Raisa – M. Grishiha – 1974 
 Minister of Social Affairs – Karomat Mirzoalieva – 1978
 Acting President –  Nizoramo Zaripova  – 1984

Tajik Republic
 Minister of Health – Inumzada Jura – 1992
 Minister, Chairperson of the State-Committee of Youth, Sports and Tourism Zebiniso – S. Rustamova – 1992
 Minister of Education – Bozgul Dodkhudoeva – 1993
 Deputy Premier Minister – Munira Abdulloyevna Inoyatova – 1994
 Deputy Minister of Foreign Affairs – Ozoda Rahmon – 2009

Taiwan

 Minister and Commissioner for Overseas Chinese – He Xiangning – 1949
Justice on the Supreme Court of the Republic of China – Chang Chin-lan – 1967
Mayor of Chiayi, first elected female city mayor – Hsu Shih-hsien – 1967
 Deputy Chairperson of the Economic Planning Council - Shirley Kuo - 1973
Minister of Finance, first appointed female minister – Shirley Kuo – 1988
Minister of Justice - Yeh Chin-fong -  1999-2000
Vice President – Annette Lu – 2000
Vice Premier – Yeh Chu-lan – 2004
Minister of Transportation and Communications – Yeh Chu-lan – 2004
President of National Assembly of the Republic of China – Yeh Chu-lan – 2005
Secretary-General to the President of the Republic of China – Yeh Chu-lan – 2005
Mayor of Kaohsiung, first elected female mayor of a special municipality  – Kiku Chen – 2006
Chairperson of the Democratic Progressive Party, first elected female leader of a major party - Tsai Ing-Wen - 2008
Vice President of the Legislative Yuan (Deputy Speaker of Parliament) – Hung Hsiu-chu – 2012
President – Tsai Ing-wen – 2016

Tannu Tuva

Chairperson of the Presidium of the Little Hural (head of state) – Khertek Anchimaa-Toka – 1940

Thailand

 Member of Parliament – Orapin Chaiyakan – 1949
 Minister of Transport – Lursakdi Sampatisiri – 1976 (one of the two first female Ministers)
 Minister of State University Affairs (now defunct) – Wimonsiri Chamnanwet – 1976 (one of the two first female Ministers)
 Minister for Office of the Prime Minister – Supatra Masdit – 1986
 Minister of Public Health – Sudarat Keyuraphan – 2001
 Minister of Culture – Uraiwan Thienthong – 2002
 Minister of Labour – Uraiwan Thienthong – 2003
 Second Deputy Speaker of House of Representatives – Lalita Lerksamran – 2005
 Minister of Agriculture and Cooperatives – Sudarat Keyuraphan – 2005
 Minister of Energy – Poonpirom Liptapanlop – 2008
 Minister of Natural Resources and Environment – Anongwan Thepsuthin – 2008
 Second Vice President of Senate – Tassana Boontong – 2008
 Minister of Commerce – Pornthiva Nakasai – 2008
 Minister of Information and Communication Technology – Ranongrak Suwanchawee – 2008
 Minister of Science and Technology (now defunct) – Kalaya Sophonpanich – 2008
 Prime Minister – Yingluck Shinawatra – 2011
 Minister of Defence – Yingluck Shinawatra – 2013
 Minister of Social Development and Human Security – Paweena Hongsakul – 2013
 Minister of Tourism and Sports – Kobkarn Wattanavrangkul – 2014
 Minister of Industry – Atchaka Sibunruang – 2015
 Minister of Education – Trinuch Thienthong – 2021
 Governor – Pateemoh Sadeeyamu – 2022

Turkmenistan

Turkmen Soviet Socialist Republic
 Deputy Minister of Public Service – Khally Nazarova – 1958
 Minister of Social Affairs  – Khally Nazarova – 1959
 Minister of Social Welfare – Anzurat Mullabavna Rakhimova – 1960
 Deputy Premier Minister – Khally Nazarova – 1963
 Minister of Education – Bibi Palvanova – 1967
 Deputy Premier Minister – Roza Atamuradovna Bazarova – 1975 
 Member of the Presidium of Supreme Soviet – Roza Atamuradovna Bazarova – 1975
 President of the Republic – Roza Atamuradovna Bazarova – 1988

Republic of Turkmenistan
 Member of the Cabinet and Prosecutor General – Gurbanbibi Sinirenovna Atajanova – 1997
 Minister of Social Affairs and Labour – Enebay Geldiyevna Atayeva – 2001
 Minister of Economy and Finance  – Enebay Geldiyevna Atayeva – 2001

United Arab Emirates
 Minister of Economic Planning – Lubna bint Khalid bin Sultan al Qasimi – 2004

Uzbekistan

Uzbek Soviet Socialist Republic
 Minister of Construction Industry – Yagdar Nasriddinova – 1952
 Chairman of the Presidium of the Supreme Soviet – Yagdar Nasriddinova – 1959
 Minister of Culture  –  Zakha Rakhimbabaeva  – 1963
 Minister of Social Affairs  –  Vasiha Sadykovna Sadykova  –  1956
 Minister of Public Service  –  Anna Brodova  – 1967
Minister of Justice – Mamlakat Sobirovna Vasikova – 1970–1984
 Deputy Premier Minister  –  Rano Kh. Abdullaeva  – 1971

Republic of Uzbekistan
 Foreign minister – Shahlo Mahmudova – 1991

Vietnam

 Minister of Social Affairs, Health and the Disabled – Dương Quỳnh Hoa – 1975 (in North Vietnam 1969)
 Minister of Education - Nguyễn Thị Định - 1976
 Member of the Council of State  - Nguyễn Thị Định - 1981
 Vice President - Nguyễn Thị Định - 1987
 Chairwoman of National Assembly - Nguyễn Thị Kim Ngân - 2016
President (Acting) - Đặng Thị Ngọc Thịnh - 2018

Yemen

South Yemen
  Member of The Presidium of the State and Deputy Minister of Information and Culture  –  1986

Yemen
 Undersecretary of Information  –  Amat Al Alim Alsoswa  – 1991
 Minister of Human Rights  –  Amat Al-Aleem Alsoswa  – 2003
 Ministry of State for Human Rights – Wahiba Fara’a – 2001

See also
List of elected and appointed female heads of state and government

References 

Asia

Asia-related lists
Asian women in politics